Jan Hable (born 4 January 1989) is a Czech footballer, who plays for Baník Ostrava.

Career 
Jan started his career at FC Hradec Králové before moving on 2 June 2007 to Serie A club, ACF Fiorentina.

On 23 January 2009 the Czech midfielder was playing, still on loan, for Banik Ostrava and on 4 January 2010 ACF Fiorentina declared that the Czech came back from the loan.

On 28 January 2010 he was transferred to Ascoli in co-ownership deal.

International 
Jan has played at various underage levels for the Czech Republic and is current captain of the Czech Republic national under-19 football team.

References

External links 
 
 

1989 births
Living people
Czech footballers
Czech Republic youth international footballers
Czech Republic under-21 international footballers
Czech First League players
ACF Fiorentina players
FC Baník Ostrava players
Association football midfielders
Expatriate footballers in Italy
FC Hradec Králové players
Ascoli Calcio 1898 F.C. players
Expatriate footballers in Greece
A.O. Kerkyra players
Serie B players
Super League Greece players
Sportspeople from Hradec Králové